Senator Abercrombie may refer to:

James Abercrombie (Congressman) (1792–1861), Alabama State Senate
John Abercrombie (congressman) (1866–1940), Alabama State Senate
Neil Abercrombie (born 1938), Hawaii State Senate